Xyleutes keyensis is a moth in the family Cossidae. It is found on the Kei Islands and Tanimbar Islands.

References

Zeuzerinae
Moths described in 1919